Solario (1922–1945) was a successful British Thoroughbred racehorse and influential sire.

Background
Bred in Ireland by the 4th Earl of Dunraven, he was by the 1918 English Triple Crown champion, Gainsborough. His dam Sun Worship, was a daughter of the outstanding sire Sundridge who was the Leading sire in Great Britain & Ireland in 1911.

Solario was sold as a yearling for the huge sum of 47,000 guineas to a British syndicate. Sir John Rutherford employed Reginald Day to condition the colt for racing.

Racing career
At age two, Solario won the 1924 Exeter Stakes and was second to Picaroon in the Middle Park Stakes. As a three-year-old, he finished fourth in the first two British Classic Races then won the third, the St Leger Stakes. At Ascot Racecourse he won the 1925 Ascot Derby. At age four, Solario ran away from the field while winning the 1926 Coronation Cup by fifteen lengths then won the Ascot Gold Cup.

Stud career
Solario commenced stud duties at Newmarket at a fee of 500 guineas a mare. In 1932 he was sold following the death of his owner, Sir John Rutherford. In his will, Rutherford left  two pictures of Solario and the Coronation Cup he won to the Blackburn Museum and Art Gallery. Solario was sent to stand at Terrace House Stud (now Tattersalls' Park Paddocks in Newmarket, Suffolk). In 1937, he was the Leading sire in Great Britain & Ireland when his son Mid-day Sun won The Derby and his daughter Exhibitionnist won the 1,000 Guineas Stakes and Epsom Oaks. Solario sired his second Epsom Derby winner when another son, Straight Deal, won the 1943 running.

Solario died at the age of twenty-three in 1945 having sired the winners of £270,000 in stakes. He is buried at Tattersalls' Park Paddocks in Newmarket.

Selected notable offspring
 Sunny Devon ( 1928) – won Coronation Stakes, Champion Three-Year-Old Filly in England
 Dastur ( 1929) – won 1931 Woodcote Stakes, in 1932 won Irish Derby,  Ascot Derby Stakes, Sussex Stakes, in 1933 won Coronation Cup, Champion Stakes
 Silversol ( 1930) – won the: 1936 Irish Oaks
 Tai-Yang ( 1930) – won 1933 Jockey Club Stakes
 Raeburn ( 1933) – won the 1936 Irish Derby
 Sind ( 1933) – Leading sire in Argentina in 1950
 Exhibitionnist ( 1934) – won 1000 Guineas, Epsom Oaks
 Mid-day Sun ( 1934) – won Epsom Derby, Hardwicke Stakes, Lingfield Derby Trial 
 Solar Flower ( 1935) – won Coronation Stakes, dam of Solar Slipper
 Sadri II ( 1936) – won 1941 Durban July Handicap
 Straight Deal ( 1940) – won 1943 Epsom Derby

Solario was the Leading broodmare sire in Great Britain & Ireland in 1943, 1949 and 1950. Through his daughters, he was the damsire of:
 Escamillo ( 1939) – winner of the 1943 Grand Prix de Saint-Cloud
 Solar Slipper ( 1945) – won the 1948 Champion Stakes and 1949 John Porter Stakes
 Cavan ( 1955) – won the American Classic, the Belmont Stakes
 Indiana ( 1961) – won St Leger Stakes

Honours
In 1925 the London & North Eastern Railway (LNER) began a tradition of naming locomotives after winning racehorses; LNER Class A1 locomotive no. 4473 (later no. 104, British Railways no. 60104) was named Solario after this horse, and remained in service until December 1959. Sandown Park Racecourse have a hospitality area known as the Solario Suite.

Pedigree

References

 Solario at the National Horseracing Museum

External links
 Solario's pedigree and partial racing stats

1922 racehorse births
1945 racehorse deaths
Racehorses bred in Ireland
Racehorses trained in the United Kingdom
British Champion Thoroughbred Sires
British Champion Thoroughbred broodmare sires
Thoroughbred family 26
Chefs-de-Race
St Leger winners